An automated threat is a type of computer security threat to a computer network or web application, characterised by the malicious use of automated tools such as Internet bots. Automated threats are popular on the internet as they can complete large amounts of repetitive tasks with almost no cost to execute.

Threat ontology

The OWASP Automated Threat Handbook provides a threat ontology list for classifying automated threats, which are enumerated below.

References

Types of malware
Impact of Automation